Eshkaft Siah (also Romanized as Eshkaft Sīāh; also known as Eshgaft-e Sīāh) is a village in Poshteh-ye Zilayi Rural District, Sarfaryab District, Charam County, Kohgiluyeh and Boyer-Ahmad Province, Iran. At the 2006 census, its population was 52, in 11 families.

References 

Populated places in Charam County